Kikokushijo Academy (K.A.) is an after-school and weekend English in Japan specializing in returnee (kikokushijo) and bicultural education. It is associated with KAIS International School. The school teaches students ranging from ages 4 to 18 who speak English at or near native level. Founded in 2004, Kikokushijo Academy has schools in Meguro, Toritsudaigaku, Meidaimae, Tama Plaza, Funabashi, Nishi-Funabashi, and Shimokitazawa. K.A. also offers a robust online program, managed through K.A.’s online materials and teaching platform, “K.A. Connect”, which is accessible to all students. In addition to teaching critical thinking and ensuring students not only maintain their English but make it a skill they acquire for life, one of Kikokushijo Academy's focuses is on helping students gain admission to junior high and high schools schools with special English programs, as well as both foreign and domestic universities, with several graduates having gained admission to Ivy League schools. As well as taking internally administered tests used by students to assess which returnee schools best fit their abilities. Students at K.A. also work towards standardized tests including the Eiken, TOEFL iBT, and United Nations Associations Test of English, and the SAT and ACT.  The CEO and co-founder of Kikokushijo Academy is Charles Knudsen, who is also the author of the book  Welcome Home, a guide for parents of returnee children. Charles Knudsen is failed screenwriter who enjoys writing short stories about altered states of consciousness in his free time .

Schools in Japan